The Roman Catholic Archdiocese of Bangui is the Metropolitan See for the Ecclesiastical province of Bangui in the Central African Republic.

History
 8 May 1909: Established as Apostolic Prefecture of Oubangui Chari from the Apostolic Vicariate of Upper French Congo 
2 December 1937: Promoted as Apostolic Vicariate of Oubangui Chari 
28 May 1940: Renamed as Apostolic Vicariate of Bangui 
14 September 1955: Promoted as Metropolitan Archdiocese of Bangui

Special churches
The seat of the archbishop is the Cathédrale Notre-Dame in Bangui.

Bishops

Ordinaries

Prefects Apostolic of Oubangui Chari (Roman rite)
Fr. Pietro Cotel, C.S.Sp. 1909–1915
Fr. Giovanni Calloch, C.S.Sp. 1915–1927
Fr. Marcel-Auguste-Marie Grandin, C.S.Sp. 2 May 1928 – 2 December 1937; see below
Vicars Apostolic of Bangui (Roman rite) 
Bishop Marcel-Auguste-Marie Grandin, C.S.Sp. 2 December 1937 – 4 August 1947; see above
Bishop Joseph Cucherousset, C.S.Sp. 9 April 1948 – 14 September 1955; see below
Metropolitan Archbishops of Bangui (Roman rite)
Archbishop Joseph Cucherousset, C.S.Sp. 14 September 1955 – 16 September 1970; see above
Archbishop Joachim N’Dayen 16 September 1970 – 26 July 2003
Archbishop Paulin Pomodimo 26 July 2003 – 26 May 2009 (resigned)
Archbishop Dieudonné Nzapalainga, C.S.Sp. 14 May 2012–present; elevated to Cardinal in 2016

Coadjutor archbishop
Joachim N’Dayen (1968–1970)

Auxiliary bishop
Edouard Mathos (1991–2004), appointed Bishop of Bambari

Other priest of this diocese who became bishop
François-Xavier Yombandje, appointed Bishop of Kaga-Bandoro in 1997

Suffragan dioceses
 Alindao
 Bambari
 Bangassou
 Berbérati
 Bossangoa
 Bouar
 Kaga–Bandoro
 Mbaïki

See also
Roman Catholicism in the Central African Republic
List of Roman Catholic dioceses in the Central African Republic

References

Sources
 GCatholic.org

External links

Bangui
Roman Catholic dioceses in the Central African Republic
A
Roman Catholic Archdiocese of Bangui